Saint-Denis FC, is a football club from Saint-Denis, Réunion Island.

They currently plays in the Réunion Premier League.

Stadium
Currently the team plays at the 2000 capacity Stade de la Redoute A.

Honours
Réunion Premier League: (5)
 Winners : 1980, 1984, 1987, 1995, 1996

Coupe de la Réunion: (8)
 Winners : 1974, 1975, 1977, 1978, 1979, 1985, 1986, 1988

Coupe D.O.M.: (1)
 Winners: 1996

Outremer Champions Cup: (1)
 Winners: 1997

References

External links
Soccerway

Saint-Denis
Association football clubs established in 1969